Álvarez (sometimes Alvarez) is a Spanish surname, a patronymic meaning "son of Álvaro". Notable people with the surname include:

Actors, singers, musicians 
Ana Álvarez (born 1969), Spanish model and actress
Andreína Álvarez (born 1979), Venezuelan actor
Carlos Álvarez (baritone) (born 1966), Spanish opera singer
Enrique Álvarez Félix (1934–1996), Mexican actor
Francisco Álvarez (actor) (1892–1960), Argentine actor                          
Ian Alvarez (born 1978), male Trinidadian soca singer known popularly as Bunji Garlin 
Izabella Alvarez (born 2004), American actress
Javier Álvarez (composer) (born 1956), Mexican composer
Karl Alvarez (born 1964), American musician
Miguel Álvarez-Fernández (born 1979), Spanish composer
Roy Alvarez (1950–2014), Filipino actor, director and screenwriter
Zayra Alvarez, Puerto Rican musician

Military figures 
Ochoa de Alvarez de Isásaga (1470–1555), Spanish nobleman, Chief of the Supreme Council of the Indies, Order of Santiago
Casta Álvarez (1776–1846), Spanish soldier
Everett Alvarez Jr. (born 1937), American naval officer and prisoner of war
Mariano Álvarez de Castro, Spanish brigadier
Mariano Álvarez (1749–1810), Filipino general, statesman, and teacher
Vicente Álvarez (general) (1862–1942), Filipino revolutionary

Painters, sculptors 
Ana Albertina Delgado Álvarez (born 1963), Cuban artist
Celia Álvarez Muñoz (born 1932), American artist
José Álvarez Cubero (1768–1827), Spanish sculptor in the neoclassical style
Mabel Alvarez (1891–1985), American oil painter, daughter of Luis F. Álvarez
Negra Álvarez (born 1948), Salvadoran visual artist
Pedro Álvarez Castelló (1967–2004), Cuban painter

Politicians 
Carlos Álvarez (American politician) (born c.1952), Cuban-American politician from Florida
Eugenio Alvarez (1918–1976), New York assemblyman
Gregorio Conrado Álvarez (1925–2016), Uruguayan general and dictator
José Manuel Álvarez, Argentine politician
Juan Álvarez (1790–1867), Mexican general and president
Julián Álvarez (1788–1843), Argentine politician
Pedro de Toledo, 1st Marquis of Mancera  (c.1585–1654), Spanish viceroy of Peru
Pedro Álvarez de Toledo, Marquis of Villafranca (1484–1553), Spanish viceroy of the Kingdom of Naples
Vicente Álvarez Travieso (1705–1779), Spanish judge and politician

Sports figures

Baseball 
Abe Alvarez (born 1982), American baseball player
Clemente Álvarez (born 1968), Venezuelan baseball player
Eddy Alvarez (born 1990), American baseball player
Francisco Álvarez (baseball) (born 2001), Venezuelan baseball player
Henderson Álvarez (born 1990), Venezuelan baseball player
Jose Alvarez (baseball, born 1956), American baseball player
José Álvarez (baseball, born 1989), Venezuelan baseball player
Juan Alvarez (born 1973), American baseball player
Pedro Alvarez (baseball) (born 1987), Dominican baseball player
Rafael Álvarez (baseball) (born 1977), Venezuelan baseball player
R. J. Alvarez (born 1991), American baseball player
Tony Álvarez (born 1979), Venezuelan baseball player
Veronica Alvarez (born 1983), American baseball catcher
Wilson Álvarez (born 1970), Venezuelan baseball player
Yadier Álvarez (born 1996), Cuban baseball pitcher
Yordan Álvarez (born 1997), Cuban-born baseball player

Basketball 
Lester Alvarez (born 1988), Filipino basketball player
Miguel Álvarez Pozo (1949–2016), Cuban basketball player
Paul Alvarez (born 1968), Filipino basketball player
Rich Alvarez (born 1980), Filipino basketball player

Football (soccer) 
Arturo Alvarez (born 1985), American footballer
Carlos Alvarez (born 1990), American soccer player
Cristian Darío Álvarez (born 1985), Argentine footballer
Cristian Osvaldo Álvarez (born 1978), Argentine footballer
Damián Ariel Álvarez (born 1979), Argentine footballer
David Álvarez Aguirre, see Kily Álvarez
Julián Álvarez (born 2000), Argentine footballer
Kily Álvarez (born 1984), Equatoguinean footballer
Leonel Álvarez (born 1965), Colombian footballer
Leonel Álvarez (born 1995), Argentine footballer
Leonel Álvarez (born 1996), Argentine footballer
Lorgio Álvarez (born 1978), Bolivian footballer
Luciano Álvarez (born 1978), Argentine footballer
Óscar Marcelino Álvarez (1948–2018), Argentine football player
Pablo Sebastián Álvarez (born 1984), Argentine footballer
Quique Álvarez (born 1975), Spanish footballer
Ricardo Gabriel Álvarez (born 1988), Argentine footballer

Other sports 
Barry Alvarez (born 1946), American football coach and sports administrator
Bernard Alvarez (born 1939), American NASCAR Cup Series driver
Bryan Alvarez (born 1975), American wrestler and journalist
Canelo Álvarez (Santos Saúl Álvarez Barragán; born 1990), Mexican boxer
Francisco Álvarez (born 1969), Cuban beach volleyball player
José Álvarez de Bohórquez, Spanish equestrian
José Luis Álvarez (born 1969), Spanish fencer
José Marcelo Álvarez (born 1975), Paraguayan fencer
Lynn Alvarez (born 1985), American mixed martial artist
María Fernanda Álvarez Terán (born 1989), Bolivian tennis player
Nancy Alvarez (born 1976), Argentine Olympic athlete
Oscar Álvarez (born 1977), Colombian road cyclist
Rafael Álvarez (diver) (born 1971), Spanish diver
Rimas Álvarez Kairelis (born 1974), Argentine rugby player
Robin Álvarez (born 1987), Swedish ice hockey player
Wilson Alvarez (born 1957), Bolivian player of American football

Writers, novelists, poets 
 Al Alvarez (1929–2019), English writer
Emilio Álvarez Lejarza (1884–1969), Nicaraguan jurist and political writer
Emilio Álvarez Montalván (1919–2014), Nicaraguan ophthalmologist and political writer
José María Álvarez de Sotomayor, Spanish playwright and poet
José Sixto Álvarez, aka Fray Mocho, Argentine writer
Julia Alvarez (born 1950), American writer
Severiano Álvarez (1933–2013), Spanish writer

Others 
 Ada Álvarez, Cuban-Mexican operations researcher
 Onion News Network's Brooke Alvarez, played by Suzanne Sena
Ciriaco Álvarez (born 1873), Chiloé businessman
Fede Álvarez (born 1978), Uruguayan filmmaker
Felix Alvarez (born 1951), Gibraltar human and civil rights activist and defender
Gabriela Álvarez (died 2017), Mexican mechanical engineer
Gregorio Álvarez (historian) (1889–1986), Argentine physician and historian
José Álvarez de Toledo, Duke of Alba (1756–1796), Spanish patron of painter Goya
Juan Álvarez (historian), Argentine judge and historian
Juan Manuel Alvarez, man convicted of causing the 2005 Glendale train crash
Luis F. Álvarez (1853–1937), American physician, father of Mabel Alvarez and Walter C. Alvarez
Luis Walter Alvarez (1911–1988), American physicist, and recipient of the Nobel Prize in Physics, son of Walter C. Alvarez, father of Walter Alvarez
Mayra Álvarez, Mexican nanoscientist
Melania Alvarez, Mexican mathematics educator in Canada
Nancy Alvarez (psychologist) (born 1950), Dominican psychologist and TV presenter
Pedro J. J. Alvarez, professor of Civil and Environmental Engineering at Rice University
Pero Alvarez, 15th-century freed Portuguese slave
Robert Alvarez (born 1948), American animator, television director, and writer
Rosendo Álvarez Gastón (1926–2014), Spanish Roman Catholic bishop
Vincent Alvares (1680–1738), Indian doctor and clergyman
Virginia Pereira Álvarez (1888–1947) Venezuelan physician
Walter Alvarez (born 1940), American geologist responsible for discovering the reasons behind Cretaceous–Tertiary extinction event, son of Luis Walter Alvarez
Walter C. Alvarez (1884–1978), American physician, son of Luis F. Álvarez, father of Luis Walter Alvarez

Fictional characters
 Dr Alvarez, criminal in James Bond

Spanish-language surnames
Patronymic surnames
Surnames from given names
Surnames of Colombian origin